A 44-part constitutional referendum was held in the Northern Mariana Islands on 3 November 1985.

Background
In 1983 a referendum on electing a Constitutional Convention was held and approved by voters. The subsequent Convention proposed 44 amendments to the Northern Mariana Islands Commonwealth Constitution, which were to be voted on individually. In order to pass, an amendment was required to be supported by both a majority of voters overall and at least two-thirds of voters in two of the three Senate constituencies.

Results

References

1985
1985 in the Northern Mariana Islands
1985 referendums
1985